Belp Castle is a castle in the municipality of Belp in the canton of Bern in Switzerland.

See also
 List of castles in Switzerland

References

External links
 

Cultural property of national significance in the canton of Bern
Castles in the Canton of Bern